The Mahamrityunjaya Mantra, also known as the Rudra Mantra or Tryambakam Mantra, is a verse (ṛc) of the Rigveda (RV 7.59.12). The ṛc is addressed to Tryambaka, "The Three-eyed One", an epithet of Rudra who is identified with Shiva in Shaivism. The verse also recurs in the Yajurveda (TS 1.8.6; VS 3.60).

The mantra 

ॐ मृत्युंजय महादेव त्राहिमां शरणागतम

जन्म मृत्यु जरा व्याधि पीड़ितं कर्म बंधनः||

om mritunje mahadev trahimam shranagatam 

janam mrityu jara vyadhi piditam karm bandhanm. 
 

The Mahamrityunjaya Mantra reads: 

 

 

Translation by Jamison and Brereton:

 "We sacrifice to Tryambaka the fragrant, increaser of prosperity.Like a cucumber from its stem, might I be freed from death, not from deathlessness."

It is said that you should recite this powerful ancient sanskrit mantra 108 times everyday, for at least 40 days to see its impact. For a noticeable level of mantra siddhi (power of the mantra), you need to repeat the mantra 125,000 times (purascharna), the equivalent of 1,250 rounds of a mala.

Origin 
The mantra first appears in Rigveda 7.59.12, which is a composite hymn attributed to Vasiṣṭha Maitrāvaruṇi. The last four verses (in which the Mahamrityunjaya Mantra is found) are late additions to the hymn, and they make references to the Sākamedha, the last of the four-monthly rituals. The Sākamedha ends with an oblation to Rudra Tryambaka, which is why the last verse of the four is addressed to Tryambaka.

Significance 
Hindus believe the mantra is beneficial for mental, emotional, and physical health and consider it a moksha mantra which bestows longevity and immortality.

It is chanted while smearing vibhuti over various parts of the body and utilised in japa (mantra repetition) or homa (religious offering ceremony).

See also 

 Shri Rudram Chamakam
 Om Namah Shivaya
 Shanti Mantras
 Shiva
 Om
 Vibhuti

Notes

References 

Vedas
Hindu mantras